Dr. Rebecca Elizabeth Wittmann, Ph.D. is an historian, writer, and professor.  Her research interests focus primarily on the Holocaust, post war Germany, the trials of Nazi perpetrators, and German legal history. Beyond Justice: The Auschwitz Trial, her debut book, was awarded the Fraenkel Prize in Contemporary History from the Wiener Library in 2005. Currently, Wittmann is an associate professor of history in undergraduate and graduate studies at the University of Toronto Mississauga.

Early life and education
Wittmann was born on February 3, 1970.

In 1992, she graduated from the University of Toronto with her Bachelor of Arts degree. Two years later, Wittmann earned her Master's degree from the University of Southern California, San Diego. In 2001, she graduated with her Ph.D. from the University of Toronto.

Career
Wittmann is an associate professor of history at the University of Toronto Mississauga. She mainly teaches classes in Modern and Contemporary Europe, the Holocaust, and remembering atrocities. In her classes, Wittmann encourages her students to "deconstruct their notion of evil."

She has previously earned fellowships from the Alexander von Humboldt Foundation, Social Sciences and Humanities Research Council of Canada, United States Holocaust Memorial Museum, and German Academic Exchange Service (DAAD).  Wittmann has written for various journals, including German History, Ethics and International Affairs, Central European History and Lessons and Legacies.

In 2005, Wittmann's first book, Beyond Justice: The Auschwitz Trial won the Fraenkel Prize in Contemporary European History for Best Book Manuscript from the Wiener Library. At the time she was doing research for the book, the trial had not yet been transcribed. Wittmann had to listen to the tapes of the trials, which helped bring, "to life the atmosphere of the trial in a way that the written word can't do."

Currently, she is working on her second book titled, Nazism and Terrorism: The Madjanek and Stammheim Trials in 1975 West Germany. So far, she has spent a year researching in Germany.

Awards
Alexander von Humboldt Fellowship, 2004-05 
Fraenkel Prize in Contemporary European History for Best Book Manuscript, Wiener Library, 2005
Dean's Special Merit Award for Teaching and Research Excellence, University of Toronto Mississauga, 2005
Fritz Stem Dissertation Prize for the 2001 dissertation in Germany history, German Historical Institute, Washington D.C., 2002 
Honorable Mention, Bullen Prize for the Best 2001 history dissertation written in Canada, Canadian Historical Association, 2002

Bibliography

Books
Beyond Justice: The Auschwitz Trial, 2005,

Articles

"The Wheels of Justice Turn Slowly: The Pre-Trial Investigations of the Frankfurt Auschwitz Trial," Central European History, 2002
"Indicting Auschwitz? The Paradox of the Auschwitz Trial," German History, 2003
 
"Legitimating the Criminal State: Former Nazi Judges on the Stand at the Frankfurt Auschwitz Trial," Lessons and Legacies VI: New Currents in Holocaust Research, 2004

External links
Gerhard Weinberg and Rebecca Wittmann: The Liberation of Europe, 1945 at Pritzker Military Museum & Library

References

Living people
University of Toronto alumni
University of Southern California alumni
Historians of the Holocaust
1970 births